Linda Ann Gray (born September 12, 1940) is an American film, stage and television actress, director, producer and former model, best known for her role as Sue Ellen Ewing, the long-suffering wife of Larry Hagman's character J.R. Ewing on the CBS television drama series Dallas (1978–1989, 1991, 2012–2014), for which she was nominated for the 1981 Primetime Emmy Award for Outstanding Lead Actress in a Drama Series. The role also earned her two Golden Globe Awards.

Gray began her career in the 1960s in television commercials. In the 1970s, she appeared in numerous TV series before landing the role of Sue Ellen Ewing in 1978. After leaving Dallas in 1989, she appeared opposite Sylvester Stallone in the 1991 film Oscar. From 1994 to 1995, she played a leading role in the Fox drama series Models Inc., and also starred in TV movies, including Moment of Truth: Why My Daughter? (1993) and Accidental Meeting (1994). She went on to reprise the role of Sue Ellen in Dallas: J.R. Returns (1996), Dallas: War of the Ewings (1998), and in the TNT series Dallas (2012–2014), which continued the original series.

On stage, Gray starred as Mrs. Robinson in The Graduate in the West End of London in 2001, then on Broadway the following year. In 2007, she starred as Aurora Greenaway in the world premiere production of Terms of Endearment at the Theatre Royal, York and stayed with the production when it toured the United Kingdom. After the second Dallas was cancelled in 2014, Gray again took to the stage, this time in the role of the Fairy Godmother in a London production of Cinderella.

Life and career

Early years
Linda Gray was born in 1940 in Santa Monica, California. She grew up in Culver City, California, where her father, Leslie, who was a watchmaker, had a shop.

Before acting, Gray worked as a model in the 1960s and began her acting career in television commercials, nearly 400 of them—and also made brief appearances in feature films, such as Under the Yum Yum Tree and Palm Springs Weekend in 1963.
 
Gray began her professional acting career in the 1970s with guest roles on many television series such as Marcus Welby, M.D., McCloud, and Switch, prior to signing with Universal Studios in 1974. She also appeared in the films The Big Rip-Off (1975) and Dogs (1976). In 1977, she was cast as fashion model Linda Murkland, the first transgender series regular on American television, in the television series All That Glitters. The show, a spoof of the soap-opera format, was cancelled after just 13 weeks. Gray was then cast as suspicious wife Carla Cord in the 1977 television movie Murder in Peyton Place.

Dallas

Gray achieved stardom for her role as Sue Ellen Ewing, J.R.'s long-suffering alcoholic wife, in the CBS drama series Dallas (1978–1989, 1991). Initially a recurring guest role for the five-episode first series, Gray became a series regular later in 1978 and remained with the show until 1989. Her character was well received by television critics. The Biography Channel stated "Who could ever forget Dallas with the vodka-swilling Sue Ellen Ewing, replete with shoulder pads long before Dynasty, staggering around Southfork Ranch with a permanently tearful expression as she suffered the brunt of J.R. Ewing’s evil ways?" The Boulevard stated "It may be 2009 and seventeen years since the primetime drama Dallas went off the air, but memories of the Ewing family still linger. Corruption and betrayal, lies, greed, affairs and scandal—all were just part of another day at the Southfork Ranch. At the center of it all was one of our favorite Ewings, the person we couldn't help but root for each week as she drank and slept her way through one ordeal after another. This, of course, was the tortured and (sometimes) villainous Sue Ellen Shepard Ewing, former Texas beauty queen and trophy wife of the womanizing rogue J.R. Ewing, played to perfection by actress Linda Gray." Gray was nominated for two Golden Globe Award for Best Actress – Television Series Drama and Primetime Emmy Award for Outstanding Lead Actress in a Drama Series for her performance on Dallas. She also received numerous international awards including Germany's Bambi Award, Italy's Il Gato and she was named Woman of the Year by the Hollywood Radio & Television Society in 1982.

After Dallas
After Dallas, Gray starred in the 1991 comedy film, Oscar with Sylvester Stallone and then made guest appearances in British drama Lovejoy (starring her co-star and love interest from her final season on Dallas, Ian McShane). She also starred in several made-for-TV movies, including 1991's The Entertainers (with Bob Newhart), Bonanza: The Return (1993), Moment of Truth: Why My Daughter (1993), and Accidental Meeting (1994). 
In 1994, she made several guest appearances on the Fox prime time soap opera Melrose Place, starring as Hillary Michaels, the mother of Amanda Woodward (Heather Locklear). She continued the role in the Melrose Place spin-off Models Inc., where her character Hillary ran a modelling agency, but the show was cancelled after one season.
Gray appeared in the Dallas reunion television movies Dallas: J.R. Returns (1996) and Dallas: War of the Ewings (1998), but in the following years did not appear in movies or on television.

In 2001, Gray portrayed Mrs. Robinson in the West End theatre production of Charles Webb's The Graduate. This brought her full circle, as her legs (not Anne Bancroft's) were the ones in the famous scene in the movie The Graduate where Mrs. Robinson's legs are admired by Dustin Hoffman. She also briefly played the role in the Broadway production, when she filled-in for Kathleen Turner in September 2002. Gray made her theater directing debut with the play Murder in the First, and other stage acting work includes: Terms of Endearment, The Vagina Monologues, Agnes of God and Love Letters.

Recent years
Gray returned to television in 2004 as a guest star in five episodes of the daytime soap opera The Bold and the Beautiful, playing Priscilla Kelly.
Gray starred in several independent films, including the award-winning drama Reflections of a Life (2006), where she played the best friend of a woman undergoing treatment for breast cancer; Expecting Mary (2010); The Flight of the Swan (2011); and Hidden Moon (2012).

In 2008, Gray appeared in The CW series 90210, which, like Melrose Place and Models Inc. before it, is a spin-off from the original Beverly Hills, 90210. Gray has now appeared in three of the five series in the franchise, though her role in 90210 was not Hillary Michaels, the character she played on Melrose Place (1992) and Models Inc.

In 2012, Gray reprised her role as Sue Ellen Ewing in the TNT drama series Dallas, a continuation of the original series. In 2013, she was listed as one of the fifty best-dressed over 50s by the Guardian. In April 2013, she was listed in People magazine's annual Most Beautiful Woman list.

Over Christmas 2014, she performed in pantomime in London, playing the Fairy Godmother in Cinderella. In 2015, she starred in the Hallmark Channel film A Perfect Wedding, and was cast as grandmother in The CW summer comedy series, Significant Mother. She also appeared as Joanna Winterthorne in the soap opera web series Winterthorne.

On 17 August 2016, it was announced that Gray would join the cast of the British Channel 4 soap opera, Hollyoaks, as Tabitha Maxwell-Brown, the mother of recently established character Marnie Nightingale, played by Lysette Anthony. Gray made her first appearance as Tabitha on 15 November 2016, and departed on 22 November 2016. It was later announced that Gray had signed a contract with Hollyoaks in order for her to appear on the soap opera for a longer period of time. The character of Tabitha returned on 27 February 2017 before departing again on 28 February 2017.

In 2017, Gray joined the cast of Amazon Studios drama series, Hand of God, starring opposite Ron Perlman and Dana Delany.

Personal life
Gray was married from 1962 to 1983 to Ed Thrasher, an art director and photographer who designed many iconic album covers throughout the 1960s and 1970s. The marriage resulted in two children: Jeff Thrasher and Kehly Sloane (a stock actress who appeared on many episodes of the original Dallas). Jeff Thrasher died of leukemia in November 2020. Gray also has two grandsons, Ryder and Jack Sloane. Her younger sister, Betty, died from breast cancer in 1989, when she was 43 years old. Gray was also the aunt (by marriage) of actress Lindsay Wagner, best known as The Bionic Woman. She resides in Los Angeles, California.

Filmography

Film

Television

Awards and nominations

References

External links 

Linda Gray Official Fan Club

BBC interview with Linda Gray and a review of her performance on stage in Terms of Endearment

1940 births
Living people
Female models from California
American stage actresses
American film actresses
American soap opera actresses
American television actresses
Actresses from Santa Monica, California
20th-century American actresses
21st-century American actresses
People from Culver City, California